Todd Larson (born 1960) is an American recognized for his contributions towards securing rights and benefits for LGBT employees of the United Nations. He served as Presidential Appointee and the Senior Lesbian, Gay, Bisexual, and Transgender (LGBT) Coordinator at the United States Agency for International Development (USAID), with a mandate to give substance and sustainability to an historic Presidential Memorandum, which established LGBTQI+ human rights and development as a new US foreign policy priority.

Elected Office 
In April 2022, in an atypically contentious election for the non-partisan Green County, WI Board of Supervisors District 25, Larson beat his opponent in a landslide, more than two to one, and turning out a higher percentage of voters than nearly any other district in the county. In doing so, Larson became the first ever openly gay elected official of Green County, WI. Simultaneously, Larson was supporting Steven Olikara in his bid to unseat US Senator Ron Johnson.

Interestingly, Larson Farm has a long political history which Larson is following. George Fjelstad Sr. who originally settled Larson Farm served as the Chairman of the Perry Town Board and later held the position of Dane County Clerk for 18 years, until 1924. And later Selma Fjelstad, George's daughter, became County Clerk in 1926, becoming the first ever woman elected to office in Dane County.

Senior Presidential Appointee in the Obama-Biden Administration 
Larson's role at USAID included a mandate to coordinate the Agency's implementation of the President's December 6, 2011 memorandum on "International Initiatives to Advance the Human Rights of LGBT Persons" and, in particular, lead ongoing inter-Agency efforts to ensure regular U.S. Government engagement with governments, citizens, civil society and the private sector to build respect for the human rights and development of LGBTQI+ persons. According to USAID Deputy Administrator Mark Feierstein, this included "bringing together domestic and global partners while ensuring that USAID is integrating LGBT considerations into every area of our work and every place where we work."

This also entailed building an LGBTQI+ office mandate, staffing table, budget and programmatic vision which had never previously existed for the US federal government. Larson also authored an historic Federal Rule binding all US foreign assistance to be made exclusively in non-discriminatory fashion.

Work with the United Nations 
Larson's work with the Federation of International Civil Servants' Associations and the UN Gay, Lesbian, Bisexual Employees group (UNGLOBE) starting in 1998 led to what are considered the first affirmative, internal policy initiatives in the then 60 year history of the UN in favor of LGBTQI+ rights, particularly a successful eight-year effort to convince the UN to give domestic partners and same-gender spouses of employees the same benefits and entitlements of employment as have always been granted to UN employees' opposite gender spouses. 

Larson was employed at the United Nations for twenty years in a variety of legal and managerial capacities, most recently as Senior Counselor at the World Intellectual Property Organization in New York. In his career at the UN, Larson served with the High Commissioner for Refugees in Indonesia and Malaysia and with the Department of Peacekeeping Operations in Cambodia, Haiti and the Former Yugoslavia.

LGBT Advocacy 
Larson previously served on the board of directors for the International Gay and Lesbian Human Rights Commission (IGLHRC, now OutRight Action International) from 2007 to 2013, and was co-chair of the board for the majority of that period. He also served on the board of directors for the Fair Wisconsin Education Fund.

Education 
Larson received his undergraduate degree in history from Carleton College in 1983 (Phi Beta Kappa and Magna Cum Laude), with an emphasis in the French language. He received his Juris Doctor degree and master's degree in international studies from the University of Washington in 1988.

Awards
Larson was recognized as a distinguished alumnus of the University of Washington School of Law in 2007, James Madison Memorial High School in 2009, the Henry M. Jackson School of International Studies in 2020, and Carleton College in 2020.

Larson was given special recognition by IGLHRC (now OutRight Action International) in 2014, commemorating his years of volunteer service and tenure as Chairperson of the Board.

Personal life 
After graduating from Carleton College in 1983, Larson served in the Peace Corps for two years in Togo, West Africa. Larson owns and manages his family property, Larson Farm. Larson's groundbreaking LGBTQI+ roles at the United Nations and in the US federal government are chronicled in a legacy article in the Wisconsin publication, Our Lives.

Larson has frequent public-speaking engagements, most recently delivering the (online) 2020 commencement address for the University of Washington School of International Studies and the keynote address at the 2019 Out After Carleton Family Reunion.

References 

1960 births
Living people
University of Washington School of Law alumni
LGBT appointed officials in the United States